TRPV3-74a is a drug which acts as a selective antagonist for the TRPV3 calcium channel. It has analgesic effects in animal studies against both neuropathic pain and normal pain responses.

References 

Trifluoromethyl compounds
2-Pyridyl compounds
Tertiary alcohols
Cyclobutanes